Hillcrest High School is a public high school in Simpsonville, South Carolina, United States, and is one of the largest high schools in the Greenville County School District. It was opened on September 3, 1957 for students from Simpsonville, Mauldin and Fountain Inn. A new building was constructed adjacent to the school in 1992, with the original building becoming Bryson Middle School.

Sports 

In 2002, 2003, and 2004, the varsity softball team won three consecutive AAAA state championships and accomplished the longest softball winning streak in the state, with 96 wins.

The following is a list of South Carolina High School League (SCHSL) state championships:

Class AAAA
 Men's cross-country – 1982
 Women's soccer – 1999
 Softball – 2002, 2003, 2004, 2012
 Volleyball – 2006, 2007, 2011, 2012, 2013
 Wrestling – 2011, 2012
 Football – 2014

Class AAAAA
Wrestling – 2019, 2020, 2021
Girls Track – 2019, 2021
Baseball – 2021

Notable alumni 

 Brett Harker  college baseball coach
 Jamon Meredith  former NFL offensive tackle
 Stephen Thompson  Ultimate Fighting Championship (UFC) fighter
 Travelle Wharton  former NFL offensive lineman

References

External links 
 

Educational institutions established in 1957
Public high schools in South Carolina
Schools in Greenville County, South Carolina
1957 establishments in South Carolina
Simpsonville, South Carolina